The Best Day of My Life (Italian: Il più bel giorno della mia vita) is a 2002 award-winning Italian drama film directed by Cristina Comencini.

Plot

The Best Day of My Life is the story of a dysfunctional family as seen through the eyes of young Chiara (Maria Luisa De Crescenzo) who is about to receive her first communion. The family includes matriarch Irene (Virna Lisi) and her three grown up children.

Cast
 Virna Lisi as Irene
 Margherita Buy as Sara
 Sandra Ceccarelli as Rita
 Luigi Lo Cascio as Claudio
 Marco Baliani as Carlo
 Marco Quaglia as Luca
 Jean-Hugues Anglade as Davide
 Ricky Tognazzi as Sandro Berardi
 Gaia Conforzi as Cecilia
 Francesco Scianna as Marco
 Francesca Perini as Silvia
 Maria Luisa De Crescenzo as Chiara
 Andrea Sama as Cammello
 Giulio Squillacciotti as Che

Awards
 2002: Grand Prix des Amériques at the Montréal World Film Festival
 2002: Silver Ribbon for Best Screenplay and Best Supporting Actress from the Italian National Syndicate of Film Journalists
 2003: Grand Prix at the Créteil International Women's Film Festival

External links

 

2002 films
2000s Italian-language films
2002 drama films
Films directed by Cristina Comencini
Films set in Rome
Films about dysfunctional families
Italian drama films
2000s Italian films